Sébastien Piocelle (born 10 November 1978) is a French former professional footballer who played as a defensive midfielder. He is the sporting director of AC Arles-Avignon.

Playing career
Born in Gouvieux, Oise, Piocelle started his career at FC Nantes, where his made his debut on 16 October 1998, against Bordeaux.

He was loaned to league rival SC Bastia in September 2000 and the deal became permanent in summer 2001. He broke his right knee in February 2002 and again in February 2004, made him miss the rest of the 2001–02 and 2003–04 season.

In his last season for Bastia, he managed to return to football on 13 November 2004 against AS Saint-Étienne, but the club finished second from bottom and Piocelle left for Crotone of Serie B that summer.

In summer 2007, after Crotone fall to Serie C1, newly promoted Serie B club Grosseto signed Piocelle. He was then signed by Serie C1 club Verona, but failed to impress there and was consequently released on 24 June 2008.

On 29 June 2009, Arles-Avignon signed the French midfielder from Italian third division club S.S. Juve Stabia. He captained Arles-Avignon from 2009 to 2011.

Piocelle won the 1997 UEFA European Under-18 Championship with France.

Coaching and managerial career
He left the position in January 2015

Ahead of the 2016–17 season, he was appointed manager of French club ARC Cavaillon. However, in December 2017, he left the position as manager to become the club's sporting director. He worked for the club until the end of the 2017–18 season, and then joined Olympique Mallemortais in May 2018, still as a sporting director. Alongside, he also worked as a consultant and TV commentator for French TV channel RMC Sport, which he joined at the end of 2017.

In July 2019, Piocelle was hired as sporting director by AC Arles-Avignon.

Honours
Nantes
Coupe de France: 1998–99
Trophée des Champions: 1999

References

External links

Profile at USGrosseto.com 

1978 births
Living people
Sportspeople from Oise
Association football midfielders
French footballers
French expatriate footballers
France under-21 international footballers
France youth international footballers
FC Nantes players
SC Bastia players
F.C. Crotone players
Hellas Verona F.C. players
F.C. Grosseto S.S.D. players
S.S. Juve Stabia players
AC Arlésien players
Nîmes Olympique players
US Pontet Grand Avignon 84 players
Maccabi Petah Tikva F.C. players
Ligue 1 players
Ligue 2 players
Championnat National players
Serie B players
Expatriate footballers in Italy
Expatriate footballers in Israel
Footballers from Hauts-de-France
French expatriate sportspeople in Italy
French expatriate sportspeople in Israel